Uchucchacuaite (AgMnPb3Sb5S12) is a rare sulfosalt mineral found in hydrothermal deposits.

It was first described in 1984 for an occurrence in the Uchucchacua Mine, Oyon Province, Lima Department, Peru and named for the mine. It has also been reported from mines in Hokkaido, Japan. It occurs with alabandite, galena, benavidesite, sphalerite, pyrite, pyrrhotite and arsenopyrite in the Peru deposit.

References 

Webmineral 

Sulfosalt minerals
Orthorhombic minerals
Minerals in space group 47